V. Balakumaran (died 2018) was once one of the two top leaders of the Eelam Revolutionary Organisation of Students (EROS) in Sri Lanka. In 1990, he and large percentage of EROS members left the organization and joined the Liberation Tigers of Tamil Eelam (LTTE). Balakumaran is believed to be active in LTTE's political division.

Background
A Tamil Tigers senior leader, Balakumaran is reported to have been seriously wounded in an assault by soldiers who had pinned the Tamil rebels down in a small patch of jungle in northeastern Sri Lanka. On January 29, 2009, it was reported that Balakumaran had been critically wounded.

References

2018 deaths
Eelam Revolutionary Organisation of Students militants
Liberation Tigers of Tamil Eelam members
Sri Lankan Tamil rebels
Year of birth missing (living people)